Dobie is both a surname and a given name. Notable people with the name include:

Surname:
 Alan Dobie (born 1932), British actor
 Armistead Mason Dobie (1881–1962), law professor and United States federal judge
 Beatrix Dobie (1887-1945), New Zealand artist
 Don Dobie (1927–1996), politician
 Gil Dobie (1878–1948), footballer
 Hector Dobie (1860–1954), politician
 J. Frank Dobie (1888–1964), American folklorist
 Mark Dobie (born 1963), footballer
 Richard Dobie (1731–1805), fur trader
 Scott Dobie (born 1978), footballer

Given name, nickname or stage name:
 Dobie Gillis Williams (1961–1999), criminal
 Dobie Gray (born 1940-2011), singer and songwriter born Lawrence Darrow Brown
 Walter Dobie Moore (1890–1963), American baseball player in the Negro leagues

Fictional characters:
 Dobie Gillis, the protagonist of a series of short stories and novels by author Max Shulman, and of the film and TV series adapted from those works

See also 
 Doby, a surname

English masculine given names
fr:Dobie